Thủ Dầu Một is the capital city of Bình Dương province, Vietnam, located at around . The city has an area of 118.66 km², with a population of 417,000 (as of 2018), and is located 20 km north of downtown Ho Chi Minh City, on the left bank of the Saigon River, upstream from the city.

Geography
Thu Dau Mot lies to the south of Bình Dương province and is contiguous with Saigon River:
 To the east is Tân Uyên
 To the west is Ho Chi Minh City
 To the south is Thuận An
 To the north is Bến Cát

Administrative divisions
Thủ Dầu Một has 14 wards:
 Phú Cường
 Chánh Mỹ 
 Chánh Nghĩa 
 Định Hòa 
 Hiệp An 
 Hiệp Thành 
 Hòa Phú  
 Phú Hòa 
 Phú Lợi 
 Phú Mỹ 
 Phú Tân 
 Phú Thọ 
 Tân An 
 Tương Bình Hiệp

Etymology
In the past, some researchers stated that the name "Thu Dau Mot" had originated from Cambodian language, but most of people claimed that the name "Thu Dau Mot" was a Vietnamese phrase, which combines two phrases that are Thu (means keep) and Dau Mot, whose the first word is a tree called dipterocarpaceae and the second one is a number. According to rumors, in a defense base (literally means "Thu") in Bình An, there was a tree on the hill (tree here is a kind of species in dipterocarpaceae, and it is called "Dau" in Vietnamese language), "Mot" is number one in Vietnamese language, so the name "Thu Dau Mot" was born, which means "one-tree-defense" literally.

Economy
Thủ Dầu Một has seen a rapid expansion and economic development since 1997, as the province has become an important industrial hub of the region. In January 2007, the city was officially recognized as a third-class town. It became a city in July 2012. There is a 4,200-ha urban-tech park under development. Thủ Dầu Một will be a modern city within the Hồ Chí Minh City Metropolitan Area (including Thủ Dầu Một, Nhơn Trạch, Tân An, Biên Hòa and parts of Đồng Nai and Bình Dương provinces).

It became a first-class city on 6 December 2017.

Points of interest

 Hội Khánh Temple
 Temple of lady Thiên Hậu
 Khu Đại Nam thế giới du lịch
 Market of  Thủ Dầu Một
 The Ông temple
 The lacquer village of Tương Bình Hiệp
 The ceramic village
 Prison of Phú Lợi
 Ancient house by the market of Thủ Dầu Một

References

External links

Populated places in Bình Dương province
Provincial capitals in Vietnam
Districts of Bình Dương province
Cities in Vietnam